Derbyshire County Cricket Club in 1948 was the  cricket season when the English club Derbyshire had been playing for seventy-seven years. It was their forty-fourth  season in the County Championship and they won eleven matches to  finish sixth in the County Championship.

1948 season

Derbyshire played 26 matches in the County Championship and one against the touring Australians. They lost to the Australians and in the County Championship won eleven matches and lost six to finish sixth.

Edward Gothard was in his second season as captain and took the wicket of Sir Donald Bradman at Derby.  Under his leadership, the club maintained the form of the previous season. Charlie Elliott was top scorer but George Pope who played fewer matches was a close second and achieved the best batting average. C Gladwin took most wickets and again in a powerful all-rounder performance Pope came close second, although the Australians declared that only two bowlers in England moved the ball away from the bat as much as Les Jackson
 
There were no debut appearances for Derbyshire in 1948.

Matches

Statistics

County Championship batting averages

County Championship bowling averages

Wicket Keepers
George Dawkes Catches 61, Stumping 4

See also
Derbyshire County Cricket Club seasons
1948 English cricket season

References

1948 in English cricket
Derbyshire County Cricket Club seasons